This is a list of football transfers involving teams from the Argentine Primera División for the January (summer) transfer window in the 2007–08 season.

Argentinos Juniors 
In
 Kevin Harbottle from  Antofagasta
 Sebastián Torrico from  Godoy Cruz (loan)
 Derlis Cardozo from  Olimpia Asunción (loan)
 Nicolás Gianni from  Universidad Católica

Out
 Sergio Escudero to  Corinthians
 Facundo Quiroga to  Atlético Tucumán (loan)
 Leandro Fleitas to  Alianza Lima (loan)
 Oscar Alegre to  Club Atlético Estudiantes (loan)
 Jonathan Páez and  Marcos Ovejero to  Defensores de Belgrano (loan)
 Martín Cabrera to  Talleres de Córdoba
 Rodrigo Díaz to  Atlético Paranaense
 Juan Ramón Fernández (released)

Arsenal de Sarandí 
In
 Mariano Uglessich from  Vélez Sársfield
 Federico Poggi from  AC Ajaccio
 Francisco Daniel Martínez from  Club Atlético Sarmiento

Out

 Carlos Báez to  Cerro Porteno
 Javier Gandolfi to  Chiapas
 Alejandro Gómez to  San Lorenzo
 Facundo Coria to  Club Sport Emelec (end of loan from Vélez Sársfield)
 Daniel Carou to  Ñublense
 Gustavo Toranzo to  2 de Mayo

Banfield 
In
 Santiago Silva from  Vélez Sársfield (loan)

Out
 Nilo Carretero to  Quilmes
 Federico Nieto to  Huracán
 Martín Rodríguez to  Nacional (loan)
 Gonzalo Robledo to  Oriente Petrolero (loan)
 Luciano Civelli to  Ipswich Town
 Guillermo Esteban to  Coronel Bolognesi

Boca Juniors 
In
 Sebastian Alberto Battaglia from  UA Maracaibo (end of loan)
 Roberto Abbondanzieri from  Getafe CF

Out
 Neri Cardozo to  Chiapas
 Jesús Dátolo to  Napoli
 Lucas Castromán to  Racing
 Mauricio Caranta to  Lanús

Colón de Santa Fe 
In

 Omar Merlo from  River Plate (end of loan)
 Alexis Ferrero from  Botafogo (loan)
 Daley Mena from  Danubio F.C. (loan) 
 Marcelo Guerrero from  Club San Luis

Out
 Sebastián Blázquez to  Deportivo Cali
 Juan Carlos Falcón and  Rubén Ramírez to  Racing Club
 César Carignano and  Sebastián Romero to  Independiente Rivadavia
 Robert Franco to  2 de Mayo
 Lucas Valdemarín to  San Luis Potosí
 Diego Crosa and Martín Cardetti (released)

Estudiantes de La Plata 
In
 Germán Ré from  Newell's Old Boys
 Cristian Sánchez Prette from  CFR Cluj
 Maximiliano Badell from  Platense (loan return)
 Gonzalo Saucedo from  Godoy Cruz (loan return)
 Carlos Valencia from  Dijon FCO

Out
 César Taborda to  Everton (loan)
 Mariano Barbosa to  River Plate (loan) 
 Iván Moreno y Fabianesi to  Rosario Central
 Cristian Bogado to  Municipal Iquique

Gimnasia y Esgrima La Plata 
In

Out
 René Lima to  Gimnasia y Esgrima de Jujuy
 Nicolás Medina to  O'Higgins
 Martín Ortiz to  Atlanta
 Carlos Kletnicki to  Unión de Santa Fe
 Daniel Romero to  Chacarita Juniors

Gimnasia y Esgrima de Jujuy 
In
 René Lima from  Gimnasia y Esgrima La Plata
 Santiago Ladino from  A.S. Bari
 Matías Cahais from  FC Groningen (loan)

Out
 César Carranza to  Colo-Colo
 David Ramírez to  Unión Española
 Gastón Montero to  Los Andes
 Federico Acuña to  Tacuary (end of loan)
 Juan Lapietra to  Independiente (end of loan)

Godoy Cruz 
In
 Sebastián Pinto from  Nancy
 Cristian Leiva from  Olimpia Asunción
 Roberto Jimenez from  Universitario
 Sebastián Rodrigo Martínez from  C.A. Cerro

Out
 Daniel Garipe to  Independiente Rivadavia
 Marcos Barrera to  Club 2 de Mayo
 Jonathan Schunke to  Almagro
 Víctor Ferreira to  Cerro Porteño (end of loan)
 Marcos Ramírez to  Independiente (end of loan)
 Gonzalo Saucedo to  Estudiantes (end of loan)
 Wilmer Crisanto to  Victoria
 Gabriel González to  Santiago Wanderers

Huracán 
In
 Eduardo Domínguez from  Los Angeles Galaxy
 Federico Nieto from  Banfield
 Nicolás Trecco from  El Linqueño
 Leonardo Medina from  Deportivo Pereira (loan)
 Mario Bolatti from  FC Porto (loan)

Out
 Germán Castillo to  Cerro Porteno
 Matías Gigli to  Club Atlético Aldosivi
 Diego Herner to  Cerro Porteno
 Alejandro Limia to  América de Cali
 Hernán Barcos to  Shanghai Shenhua
 Carlos Casartelli,  Matías Manrique y  Hugo Barrientos (released)

Independiente 
In
 Eduardo Tuzzio from  River Plate
 Juan Lapietra from  Gimnasia y Esgrima de Jujuy (end of loan)
 Enzo Bruno from  San Martín de Tucumán (end of loan)
 José Moreno Mora from  América de Cali (end of loan)
 Marcos Ramírez from  Godoy Cruz (end of loan)
 Diego Gavilan from  Portuguesa
 Gastón Machín from  Newell's Old Boys (end of loan)

Out
 Mariano Herrón to  Deportivo Cali (loan)
 Adrián Calello to  Dinamo Zagreb
 Damián Luna to  Universidad Católica
 Cristian Rolando Ledesma to  Olimpia
 Freddy Grisales to  Envigado
 Hilario Navarro to  San Lorenzo (loan)

Lanús 
In

 Mauricio Caranta from  Boca Juniors

Out

 Gustavo Balvorín (released)

Newell's Old Boys 
In
 Lucas Bernardi from  AS Monaco
 Santiago Salcedo from  River Plate (loan)

Out
 Ariel Zapata (retired)
 German Re to  Estudiantes de La Plata
 Cristian Fabbiani to  River Plate (loan)
 Walter Fretes to  Cerro Porteño
 Pablo Vranjicán to  Rangers de Talca
 Diego Barreto to  Sol de América
 Luis Escalada to  Real Salt Lake
 Juan Carlos Ferreyra to  Macará
 Marcos Flores to  Curicó Unido
 Héctor Gaitán to  Oriente Petrolero (loan)
 Sebastián Grazzini to  Racing
 Gastón Machín to  Independiente (end of loan)
 Diego Scotti to  Racing de Montevideo
 Claudio Husaín and  Germán Rivera (released)

Racing Club 
In
 Juan Carlos Falcón from  Colón de Santa Fe (loan)
 Nicolás Vigneri from  Cruz Azul
 Lucas Castromán from  Boca Juniors
 Rubén Ramírez from  Colón de Santa Fe
 Sebastián Grazzini from  Newell's Old Boys

Out
 Maximiliano Moralez to  Vélez Sársfield
 Luis Alberto Benítez to  Olmedo
 Gabriel Méndez to  Olmedo
 Sebastián Arrieta to  Unión de Santa Fe

River Plate 
In
 Nicolás Domingo from  Genoa C.F.C. (end of loan)
 Marcelo Gallardo from  D.C. United
 Cristian Fabbiani from  Newell's Old Boys (loan)
 Mariano Barbosa from  Estudiantes de la Plata (loan) 
 Rubens Sambueza from  Flamengo (Return of loan

Out
 Omar Merlo to  Colón de Santa Fe
 Eduardo Tuzzio to  Independiente
 Sebastian Abreu to  Real Sociedad
 Leonardo Ponzio to  Real Zaragoza
 Santiago Salcedo to  Newell's Old Boys (loan)

Rosario Central 
In
 Gonzalo Choy from  Monterrey
 Pablo Álvarez from  Catania (loan)
 Matías Escobar from  Kayserispor (loan)
 Pablo Lima from  Vélez Sársfield (loan)
 Iván Moreno y Fabianesi from  Estudiantes de la Plata

Out
 Ignacio Ithurralde to  C.A. Peñarol

San Lorenzo 
In
 Alejandro Gómez from  Arsenal de Sarandí
 Jonathan Bottinelli from  Sampdoria (loan)
 Bruno Fornaroli from  Sampdoria (loan)
 Jonathan Santana from  VfL Wolfsburg (loan)
 Hilario Navarro from  Independiente (loan)

Out
 Walter Acevedo to  FC Metalist Kharkiv
 Santiago Hirsig to  Kansas City Wizards
 Juan Carlos Menseguez to  West Bromwich Albion F.C. (loan)

San Martín de Tucumán 
In
 Cesar La Paglia from  Defensor Sporting
 Matías Urbano from  Cúcuta
 Jorge Anchén from  AIK
 Cristian Canio from  Everton (on loan from Atlante) 

Out

 Enzo Bruno to  Independiente (end of loan)
 Gerardo Solana to  Defensa y Justicia
 Matías Ceballos to  Gimnasia y Tiro de Salta
 Fabián García to  Sportivo Guzmán
 Andrés Imperiale to  Oriente Petrolero

Tigre 
In
 Guillermo Suarez from  Dinamo Zagreb (loan)

Out
 Luis David Fernández to  Quilmes

Vélez Sársfield 
In

 Franco Razzotti from  Sporting Cristal (end of loan)
 Maximiliano Moralez from  Racing Club
 Sebastián Domínguez from  Club América
 Joaquín Larrivey from  Cagliari (loan)
 Maximiliano Timpanaro from  Chacarita Juniors (end of loan)

Out
 Emmanuel Fernandes Francou to  Talleres de Córdoba
 Pablo Lima to  Rosario Central (loan)
 Santiago Silva to  Banfield (loan)
 Mariano Uglessich to  Arsenal de Sarandí

References 

2009
Transfers
Football transfers winter 2008–09